The 1988 Full Members' Cup final was the third Full Members' Cup final, contested by First Division side Luton Town and Second Division team Reading at Wembley Stadium on 27 March 1988. It was the first, and only, Full Members' Cup final for both teams. Reading were making their first appearance at the national stadium, while Luton had not played at the ground since 1959.

Background
English teams had been banned from Europe following the Heysel Stadium disaster at the 1985 European Cup final between Liverpool and Juventus. The Football League started a new tournament for sides in the top two leagues to increase revenues, particularly for sides who had lost revenue through the lack of European football. The 1987–88 Full Members' Cup saw Reading start in the first round of the competition, while Luton were given a bye to the third round following their high league position in the previous season. Reading defeated a top division side in all rounds, excluding the quarter-finals.

Reading's semi-final victory against Coventry City became the latest finish to a football match in Britain at the time, finishing at 22:38. The record stood until 2002.

Route to the final

Luton Town

Reading

Match summary
England international Mick Harford put Luton 1–0 up after fourteen minutes, although he admitted after the game that he handled the ball into the net. On twenty minutes, Michael Gilkes levelled the game for Reading. Gilkes was fouled five minutes later and Reading were awarded a penalty. Stuart Beavon dispatched it, despite Les Sealey, in the Luton goal, guessing the right direction. Mick Tait doubled Reading's lead on 55 minutes, while Neil Smillie finished the game off with the Royals' fourth.

Aftermath
Reading became the second non-top flight side in a row to win the competition, after Blackburn Rovers, but were unable to defend the trophy due to relegation to the Third Division later on in the season. The club never played a Full Members' Cup match again, before the competition was abolished at the end of the 1991–92 season. The victory remains the only major trophy that the club has won, with two semi-final appearances in the FA Cup being the next best cup results for Reading.

Victory for Luton would've been their first major trophy, as well, but they only had to wait a month after the Full Members' Cup final before they defeated Arsenal in the League Cup final to do so. They subsequently finished their First Division season in ninth position. Luton didn't appear in another Full Members' Cup final; a southern semi-final appearance in the 1990–91 season being their best performance following their defeat.

Match details

References

External links
Photos at Mirrorfootball

Full Members' Cup 1988
Full Members' Cup 1988
1988
1987–88 in English football
March 1988 sports events in the United Kingdom
1988 sports events in London